Milton Township is one of the fourteen townships of Mahoning County, Ohio, United States. The 2010 census found 3,759 people in the township, 2,579 of whom lived in the unincorporated portions of the township.

Geography
Located in the northwestern corner of the county, it borders the following townships:
Newton Township, Trumbull County - north
Lordstown - northeast corner
Jackson Township - east
Ellsworth Township - southeast corner
Berlin Township - south
Deerfield Township, Portage County - southwest corner
Palmyra Township, Portage County - west
Paris Township, Portage County - northwest corner

The village of Craig Beach is located in northwestern Milton Township, and the unincorporated community of Lake Milton lies at the center of the township.  Both are resort communities which developed around a reservoir which is now the primary feature of Lake Milton State Park.

Name and history
It is one of five Milton Townships statewide.

Government
The township is governed by a three-member board of trustees, who are elected in November of odd-numbered years to a four-year term beginning on the following January 1. Two are elected in the year after the presidential election and one is elected in the year before it. There is also an elected township fiscal officer, who serves a four-year term beginning on April 1 of the year after the election, which is held in November of the year before the presidential election. Vacancies in the fiscal officership or on the board of trustees are filled by the remaining trustees.

References

External links
Township website
County website

Townships in Mahoning County, Ohio
Townships in Ohio